is a regional/second class airport located  southeast of Akita Station in the city of Akita, in Akita Prefecture, Japan.

History
Akita Airport was originally opened on October 1, 1961, on the Omonogawa coast of the Sea of Japan approximately 20 kilometers southeast of the center of Akita City. The airport has a 1200-meter runway, which was extended to 1500 meters in 1967 and 1625 meters in 1969, but was adversely affected by crosswinds, and by the television transmission antennas of 123-meter Mount Omoriyama adjacent to the site.

The current Akita Airport was opened at its present location on June 26, 1981, and was the first civilian airport in the Tōhoku region of Japan to have a 2500-meter runway.  In 1985, the Japan Air Self-Defense Force established a search and rescue unit based at Akita Airport. As of 2016 it is equipped with UH-60J and U-125A aircraft. An international terminal was established on July 5, 1993, beginning scheduled flights to South Korea.

Airlines and destinations

Gallery

References

External links

 Ministry of Land, Infrastructure and Transport
 Akita Airport Guide from Japan Airlines
 
 

Airports in Japan
Transport in Akita City
Transport in Akita Prefecture
Buildings and structures in Akita (city)
Airports established in 1961
1961 establishments in Japan